Dou Yuejiao, ancestral name Mi, clan name Ruo'ao, was a Chu politician and aristocrat during 7th century BCE. He was best known for being the initiator of the Ruo'ao rebellion, a rebellion of Ruo'ao clan against King Zhuang of Chu.

Life 
Yuejiao was the son of Dou Ziliang and the nephew of Dou Guwutu. His family was a cadet branch of Chu's ruling house Mi-Xiong. The Ruo'ao clan; consists of Dou and Cheng, descended from king Ruo'ao of Chu.

When Yuejiao was young, he was said to be resented by his uncle Guwutu. Guwutu, according to Zuo Zhuan, described him a "wolf poppy with a savage heart"() and believed that Yuejiao will bring disasters to the Ruo'ao clan. Viscount Xuan of Zhao, a retainer of Jin, also had a negative view on the Ruo'ao clan led by Yuejiao.

King Zhuang of Chu succeeded Chu's throne in a young age, Cheng Jia of Ruo'ao was the Lingyin of Chu. The king find himself devoid of any actual political influence over his nation. After Cheng Jia's death, King Zhuang promoted Wei Jia to the post of Lingyin, weakening Ruo'aos power. Wei Jia was explicitly hostile to Ruo'aos. Under his advice, the King executed prime minister Dou Ban. Although king Zhuang soon appointed Yuejiao as the successor of Ban, Wei Jia was given the post of Sima, the supreme military commander of Chu. This arrangement of power intensified the hostilities between Ruo'ao and Wei clan.

Since Wei Jia and King Zhuang's had become imminent threats to the Ruo'ao clan. Yuejiao reacted to this predicament by imprisoning Wei Jia in Liaoyang (Today's Nanyang, Henan province) and killing him. He then organized his troops in Zhengye (Today's Xinye) and openly started an armed rebellion against king Zhuang of Chu in 605 BCE.

The rebellion was initially successful and king Zhuang had agreed to truce. However, Yuejiao rejected the king's proposal and fought with him in the battle of Gaohu (Today's Xiangyang). The battle turned out to be a victory of king Zhuang. Yuejiao was killed during the battle.

After the rebellion was put down, the majority of Ruo'ao clansmen were executed by King Zhuang of Chu. Only Dou Kehuang, the son of Yuejiao's cousin Dou Ban, was forgiven. The fall of Ruo'aos were still mentioned more than 17 centuries later by Sima Guang in his work Zizhi Tongjian.

Even long after the death of Dou Yuejiao, the remaining members of Ruo'ao clan were severely discriminated in Chu. In 530 BCE, more than seventy years after the Ruo'ao rebellion, king Ling of Chu executed Cheng Hu due to the fact that he was a Ruo'ao.

Yuejiao's son Dou Benhuang fled to the state of Jin and would later avenge his father's death in the battle of Yanling.

References 

Lingyin of Chu
Zhou dynasty nobility
7th-century BC births
600s BC deaths